Karlovich is a surname. Notable people with this name include the following:
Anastasiya Karlovich (born 1982), Ukrainian chess grandmaster

Karlovich may also be an alternative Anglicisation, or a phonetic misspelling, of the following surnames:
 Carlovich, the surname of Argentine football player Tomás Carlovich
Karlović, a Croatian surname
Karłowicz, a Polish surname

Middle name
Konstantin Karlovich Albrecht (1836 – 1893), Russian cellist
Yuri Karlovich Arnold (1811 – 1898), Russian composer
Yan Karlovich Berzin (1889 – 1938), Soviet politician
Nikolay Karlovich Krabbe (1814 – 1876), Russian Imperial Naval admiral
Georgij Karlowich Kreyer (1887- 1942), Russian botanist and mycologist
Vladimir Karlovich Roth (1848 – 1916), Russian neuropathologist

See also

Karlowitz (disambiguation)
Karlovica
Karlovice (disambiguation)
Karpovich
Kurlovich

Russian-language surnames